The 2010–11 Spanish football season is Sevilla Fútbol Club's tenth consecutive season in La Liga. The team manager for the previous season, Antonio Álvarez, continued on the role until the 2–0 defeat against Hércules on 26 September 2010. After the match, Gregorio Manzano was appointed manager, assisted by former player Javier Navarro.

Trophies balance

Competitive balance

Summer transfers

In

Out

Loan in

Loan out

Loan return

Loan end

Winter transfers

In

Out

Loan out

Current squad

Squad

Youth system

Long-term injuries

Sergio Sánchez's cardiac pathology
Out between: January–December 2010
On 1 January 2010, Sevilla's medical services detected some cardiac pathology in Sergio Sánchez's heart and they recommended to him to stop his activity with the team. In May 2010, he was surgical operated in Hamburg, Germany, and received orders of resting during six or seven months, when there will be valued (beginning of 2011) the possibility of returning to play football. On 27 December 2010, doctors at Vall d'Hebrón Hospital in Barcelona had officially told Sevilla that Sánchez has passed the latest tests about his recovery because of the surgical operation, so he can play football again from 2011.

Jesús Navas' left ankle (I) 
Out between: 16–30 September 2010 ; October 2010 – January 2011
On 16 September 2010, in the Europa League match against Paris Saint-Germain, Jesús Navas twisted his left ankle. He had to be replaced during that match because he couldn't walk as usual. His injury didn't appear serious, and he was considered recovered and fit to play in the pre-game Europa League against Borussia Dortmund at the Westfalenstadion. He had to be replaced on 76' because of a strong relapse. He was replaced by Julien Escudé. During October, it was thought that he needed surgery. He submitted it on 1 November in Vitoria-Gasteiz. He was operated by Dr. Mikel Sánchez and could return to play after Christmas, on 2 January against Osasuna.

Tiberio Guarente's injured leg 
Out between: November 2010 – Following season
On 6 November 2010, Sevilla's medical services discovered a strange injury in Tiberio Guarente's leg that required treatment, ultimately sidelining him for six months.

Jesús Navas' left ankle (II) 
Out between: April 2011 – Following season

In a training session prior to a match against Mallorca, Jesús Navas had discomfort in his left ankle, which had been twisted in the beginning of the session in a Europa League match against Paris Saint-Germain. He was not called to that match and medical tests were made. It was discovered that he suffered from a relapse of that injury, a stress fracture in his ankle that will keep him out of play for six weeks. It is believed he will not play more in the remainder of the season.

Nominated by their national football team

Match stats

Match results

Pre-season

Friendly matches

16th Trofeo de la Sal

Achille & Cesare Bortolotti Trophy

56th Ramón de Carranza Trophy

3rd Antonio Puerta Trophy

Supercopa de España

Final

|}

First leg

Second leg

La Liga

 Win   Draw   Lost

 Liga BBVA Winner (also qualified for 2011–12 UEFA Champions League Group Stage)
 2011–12 UEFA Champions League Group Stage
 2011–12 UEFA Champions League 4th Qualifying Round
 2011–12 UEFA Europa League Group Stage
 2011–12 UEFA Europa League 4th Qualifying Round (From 3 February: 5th and 6th Liga BBVA qualified teams because of the 2011 Copa del Rey Final)
 2011–12 UEFA Europa League 3rd Qualifying Round (From 3 February: 7th Liga BBVA qualified team because of the 2011 Copa del Rey Final)
 Relegation to Liga Adelante

With Antonio Álvarez

With Gregorio Manzano

UEFA Champions League

Play-off round

UEFA Europa League

Group stage

Round of 32

Sevilla 2–2 Porto on aggregate. Porto won on away goals.

Copa del Rey

Round of 32

Sevilla won 10–1 on aggregate.

Round of 16

Sevilla won 8–3 on aggregate.

Quarter-finals

Sevilla won 6–3 on aggregate.

Semifinals

Real Madrid won 3–0 on aggregate.

Others

Antonio Álvarez sacked during the season 

After the successful end of the 2009–10 season, during which the team could qualify for the qualifying round 4 of the UEFA Champions League thanks to a goal from Rodri in Almería in the 95th minute, and the achievement of the 2009–10 Copa del Rey, won the fifth time in club's history, Antonio Álvarez was renowned as the team coach. After an uncertain pre-season with signings that did not seem to provide a good performance, as well as a hesitant start in Champions League and disastrous at Europe League, the directive issued an ultimatum to Álvarez: His team could not lose in Alicante against Hércules. Sevilla, however, fell precipitously; Trezeguet scored twice on 26 September at the Estadio José Rico Perez. After an impromptu meeting of the directive in Seville, on the morning from 26 to 27 September, Álvarez was sacked, with Gregorio Manzano announced as his replacement for the remainder of the season.

Álvarez's matches balance:

3rd Champions for Africa 
Three years ago, on 2008 Christmas, Frédéric Kanouté and his own foundation organized a special Christmas match with Unicef trying to help African kids about their education with the ticket's prices and the anonymous donations. The first edition was held in Seville at the Ramón Sánchez Pizjuán, with a smaller support than in 2009 when the match was organized in Madrid at the Santiago Bernabéu, with three-quarters of the stadium full of fans. Both matches have been broadcast in some foreign countries, like United Kingdom and Mali. This year, with more help for the Fundación Kanouté, the match will be held at the Vicente Calderón, the home of Atlético Madrid, on 29 December. Africa United coach José Mourinho starred the funniest anecdotes of the match, taking with him his sons, who threw the ball to one of the goalkeepers of his father's team at half-time, Andrés Palop. In addition, Mourinho plated the linesman in the second-half due to the many marked offsides against his team and took with him to an amateur teen who jumped into the Vicente Calderón to greet a player of the Liga BBVA XI.

Vamos Deixar-te Sem o Título
After completing the game between Sevilla and Levante (4–1 home win), the stadium lights went out suddenly after the referees and Levante players retired from the pitch. In the video scoreboard it was shown a video with Andrés Palop's voice background encouraging Sevilla fans to go to the stadium on 26 January to watch the first leg of Copa del Rey Semifinals against Real Madrid CF. The video ended with an image of the Copa del Rey and the phrases "¿Quieres otra Copa?" [Do you want another Cup?] and "Que ningún madridista te quite el asiento" ("Try to avoid that any Real Madrid fan steals your seat") and "Vamos Deixar-te Sem o Título"  ("We will leave you without the title"). The press in Madrid, akin to Real Madrid, slammed this initiative, considering it disrespectful.

They identified the "We will leave you without the title" as an offensive reference to Real Madrid's José Mourinho. Sevilla also distributed leaflets with the same image and the same phrases. Sevilla coach Gregorio Manzano said at the news conference that he had not seen them. When a reporter gave him one, he just said that "it was an original initiative".

LFP failed strike
On 11 February 2011, the Liga de Fútbol Profesional (LFP) officially announced a planned strike for La Liga matchday 30 (1, 2 and 3 April 2011) if the Spanish government did not forbid a new TV law regarding La Liga broadcasting. and if it does not give the league a sufficient part of the earnings from La Quiniela, a football pool run by the state lottery. Following Spanish law, at least one match of each La Liga matchday must be broadcast by common TV (laSexta, on the Spanish TDT). The LFP wanted to force pay TV channels and radio stations to broadcast entire matches or summaries too. On 22 March, the LFP announced that nothing had changed to that moment and the strike was official. Seven La Liga teams (Villarreal, Real Sociedad, Athletic Bilbao, Espanyol, Zaragoza, Sevilla and Málaga) had made official their decision about playing that matchday as usual, presenting an interim measure before a court of Madrid. LFP Vice-president (and Sevilla FC vice-president) stepped down, citing disagreement with the decision taken by the LFP in February, calling it coercion.

After weeks of discussions without reaching any conclusion, the judge presiding over the case, Ms. Purificación Pujol, announced on 30 March that the seven La Liga clubs, along with Real Madrid and Barcelona, which joined days after, were right. Therefore, the same morning, the LFP had to organize on the fly the schedule of matchdays 30 in La Liga and 32 in the Liga Adelante.

References

External links
2010–11 Sevilla FC season at ESPN

2010-11
Spanish football clubs 2010–11 season
2010–11 UEFA Europa League participants seasons